In Greek mythology, Zeuxippe (Ancient Greek: Ζευξίππη) was the name of several women. The name means "she who yokes horses," from zeugos, "yoke of beasts" / "pair of horses," and hippos, "horse."

Zeuxippe, a naiad nymph of Athens and the mother of Erechtheus, Butes, Procne, Philomela and possibly Teuthras by King Pandion I. She was the sister of Praxithea.
Zeuxippe, the Athenian naiad-daughter of the river god Eridanos. She was the mother of Butes by Teleon.
Zeuxippe, a Sicyonian princess as the daughter of King Lamedon (son of Coronus) and Pheno. She was the wife of Sicyon and the mother of Chthonophyle.
Zeuxippe, daughter of Hippocoon and the mother of Oicles and Amphalces with Antiphates.
Zeuxippe, daughter of Athamas and possibly the mother of Ptous by Apollo.
Zeuxippe, a Trojan queen as the possible wife of King Laomedon and the mother of his children.

Notes

References 

 Apollodorus, The Library with an English Translation by Sir James George Frazer, F.B.A., F.R.S. in 2 Volumes, Cambridge, MA, Harvard University Press; London, William Heinemann Ltd. 1921. . Online version at the Perseus Digital Library. Greek text available from the same website.
Apollonius Rhodius, Argonautica translated by Robert Cooper Seaton (1853-1915), R. C. Loeb Classical Library Volume 001. London, William Heinemann Ltd, 1912. Online version at the Topos Text Project.
 Apollonius Rhodius, Argonautica. George W. Mooney. London. Longmans, Green. 1912. Greek text available at the Perseus Digital Library.
 Diodorus Siculus, The Library of History translated by Charles Henry Oldfather. Twelve volumes. Loeb Classical Library. Cambridge, Massachusetts: Harvard University Press; London: William Heinemann, Ltd. 1989. Vol. 3. Books 4.59–8. Online version at Bill Thayer's Web Site
 Diodorus Siculus, Bibliotheca Historica. Vol 1-2. Immanel Bekker. Ludwig Dindorf. Friedrich Vogel. in aedibus B. G. Teubneri. Leipzig. 1888–1890. Greek text available at the Perseus Digital Library.
 Gaius Julius Hyginus, Fabulae from The Myths of Hyginus translated and edited by Mary Grant. University of Kansas Publications in Humanistic Studies. Online version at the Topos Text Project.
Graves, Robert, The Greek Myths, Harmondsworth, London, England, Penguin Books, 1960. 
Graves, Robert, The Greek Myths: The Complete and Definitive Edition. Penguin Books Limited. 2017. 
 Pausanias, Description of Greece with an English Translation by W.H.S. Jones, Litt.D., and H.A. Ormerod, M.A., in 4 Volumes. Cambridge, MA, Harvard University Press; London, William Heinemann Ltd. 1918. . Online version at the Perseus Digital Library
Pausanias, Graeciae Descriptio. 3 vols. Leipzig, Teubner. 1903.  Greek text available at the Perseus Digital Library.
Stephanus of Byzantium, Stephani Byzantii Ethnicorum quae supersunt, edited by August Meineike (1790-1870), published 1849. A few entries from this important ancient handbook of place names have been translated by Brady Kiesling. Online version at the Topos Text Project.

Naiads
Children of Potamoi
Princesses in Greek mythology
Queens in Greek mythology
Women of Apollo
Mortal parents of demigods in classical mythology
Attican characters in Greek mythology
Boeotian characters in Greek mythology
Sicyonian characters in Greek mythology
Mythology of Argos